John P. Erickson (June 30, 1825 – August 2, 1907) was a Union Navy sailor in the American Civil War and a recipient of the U.S. military's highest decoration, the Medal of Honor, for his actions during the Wilmington Campaign.

Born in 1825 in Sweden, Erickson immigrated to the U.S. and was living in Brooklyn when he joined the Navy. He was severely wounded and received treatment at a hospital in Portsmouth, Virginia. For his actions during the campaign, he was awarded the Medal of Honor months later on June 22, 1865.

Erickson's official Medal of Honor citation reads:
The President of the United States of America, in the name of Congress, takes pleasure in presenting the Medal of Honor to Captain of the Forecastle John P. Erickson, United States Navy, for extraordinary heroism in action while serving on board the U.S.S. Pontoosuc during the capture of Fort Fisher and Wilmington, North Carolina, 24 December 1864, to 22 February 1865. Carrying out his duties faithfully throughout this period, Captain of the Forecastle Erickson was so severely wounded in the assault upon Fort Fisher that he was sent to the hospital at Portsmouth, Virginia. Erickson was recommended for his gallantry, skill, and coolness in action while under the fire of the enemy.

Erickson died on August 2, 1907, at age 82 and was buried at Green-Wood Cemetery in Brooklyn.

See also
List of Medal of Honor recipients
Wilmington Campaign
First Battle of Fort Fisher

Notes

References

External links
National Park Service - Battle Detail - The Civil War  - Fort Fisher I
National Park Service - Battle Detail - The Civil War  - Fort Fisher II
 National Park Service - Battle Detail - The Civil War  - Wilmington

1826 births
1907 deaths
Swedish sailors
English emigrants to the United States
People from Brooklyn
People of New York (state) in the American Civil War
Union Navy sailors
United States Navy Medal of Honor recipients
English-born Medal of Honor recipients
Burials at Green-Wood Cemetery
American Civil War recipients of the Medal of Honor